Blaurock is a surname. Notable people with the name include:

Carl Blaurock (1894–1993), American mountain climber
Edmund Blaurock (1899–1966), German Generalleutnant
George Blaurock (c. 1491–1529), Swiss Anabaptist and Reformer

See also
Mount Blaurock,  is a high mountain summit of the Collegiate Peaks in the Sawatch Range of the Rocky Mountains of North America